There is a large community of Chinese migrants residing in the Republic of Congo.

Several Chinese engineering firms work in Congo as contractors for major infrastructure projects and employ Chinese construction workers as a part of the overall workforce. At a Beijing Construction Engineering Group construction site in March 2012 in Brazzaville, 6 Chinese workers were killed and dozens injured when a blast occurred after a fire at a munitions depot devastated the adjacent neighborhood.

Notable people
 Yang Fen, table tennis player (2008 Olympics)
 Han Xing, table tennis player (2012 and 2016 Olympics)
 Wang Jianan, table tennis player (2016 Olympics)

References

Republic of Congo
Ethnic groups in the Republic of the Congo